Virginia's elections of 1869 occurred during the post-American Civil War Reconstruction Era and included African-American candidates and so-called "carpetbaggers", politicians from the North, often former Union Army officers, who ran in elections in southern states then under the authority of the Federal government and U.S. Army. The election included the  1869 Virginia gubernatorial election held on July 6, 1869 to elect the governor of Virginia. Gilbert Carlton Walker was elected as a "True Republican" defeating H. H. Wells, who was running as a "Radical Republican." Walker switched his party affiliation to Democratic in 1870.

Elections results brought 21 African Americans to office in the Virginia House of Delegates and six to the Virginia State Senate. Thomas Bayne was a party leader among the African-American group, although he lost the election when a White Republican ran against him in the same election, splitting the vote and allowing a Democrat to win.

Gubernatorial election results

References 

1869
Virginia
gubernatorial
July 1869 events